The Spanish munitions company Instalaza made two models of rifle grenade during the 1960s. As well as being used by the Spanish Army, the Portuguese Army also used them in the colonial wars that took place in its colonies in Africa.

The Type I could penetrate 250mm of armour, whereas the lighter Type II could penetrate 150mm of armour.

Each was propelled by being mounted atop a rifle's 22 mm grenade launching adapter, and being launched by a ballistite (blank) cartridge.

The Type II was enhanced further, with a bullet trap to accept 5.56×45mm NATO and is known as the FLV.

Sources and references

External sources
Article (in Spanish) with reference to the Instalaza rifle grenades

Weapons of Spain
Rifle grenades
Anti-tank grenades
Military equipment introduced in the 1970s